Dexiosoma is a genus of flies in the family Tachinidae.

Species
D. caninum (Fabricius, 1781)
D. lineatum Mesnil, 1970
D. nigricorne Zhang & Liu, 2006

References

Tachininae
Tachinidae genera
Taxa named by Camillo Rondani